The 1998 Australia rugby union tour of Europe was a series of matches played in November 1998 in Europe by Australia national rugby union team.

Results
Scores and results list Australia's points tally first.

References
 

1998 rugby union tours
1998 in Australian rugby union
1998
1998–99 in European rugby union
1998–99 in French rugby union
1998–99 in English rugby union
1998
1998